Hyde and Shriek was a British comics series, published in The Dandy between 1991 and 1992, drawn by Tom Paterson. It was about a boy called Erbert Hyde, who lives in Castle Hyde with Mr. Shriek, Hyde's servant who is a vampire. While Shriek wanted his master to be more scary, Erbert Hyde found life at Castle Hyde dull and boring and wished to live a more normal life.

Once The Dandy became full colour in September 1993, this strip was dropped, but returned in 2004 as reprints (Prior to the Dandys new look) and new material was introduced the following year. The strip was toned down somewhat. In a similar way to Calamity James, the strip lost much of its wackiness once it became full colour. Shriek still wanted his master to be scarier, but Erbert Hyde became more of a wimp than before and often acted noticeably soft and a bit more simple-minded. This version of the strip disappeared in 2007, but returned the following year, drawn by Nick Brennan. In December 2008, Brennan started drawing the stories and the plot was changed to Hyde being a wimpy orphan boy whose wish to live in a fairy tale castle goes wrong. After a hellish first few days where he sees that he is actually being sent off to Mister Shriek's castle in Transylvania, it doesn't get any better for him. The strip last appeared around 2009.

References 

1991 comics debuts
1992 comics endings
Comic strip duos
Comics about orphans
Comics set in Romania
Male characters in comics
Dandy strips
Horror comics
Humor comics
Vampires in comics